Sudaniola is a genus of snout moths. It was described by Roesler in 1973. It contains only one species Sudaniola remanella, which is found in Spain and Sudan.

References

Phycitini
Monotypic moth genera
Moths of Europe
Moths of Africa
Pyralidae genera